Mimmi Linnéa Marianne Sandén (born 25 December 1995), also known by the stage name Mimi (stylized in all caps) is a Swedish singer and actress who came to fame by becoming 1st runner up in the television show Talang 2007 (Sweden's Got Talent).

Biography
As a student Sandén attended the Adolf Fredrik's Music School in Stockholm. She performed the songs Knock on Wood, Total Eclipse of the Heart and Tonight Is What It Means to Be Young/Holding Out for a Hero. By media she has been described to be similar to Bianca Ryan. But her career started in 2002 when she was cast in  the theater version of "Fem Myror Är Fler Än Fyra Elefanter" where she played between 2002 and 2003, she also during the same time joined Carolas Christmas show which toured around Sweden. On 28 July 2007, she performed on Sommarkrysset on TV4. Since late 2007, Mimmi has had a television show on TV4 called Mimmi & Mojje together with Morgan Johansson, and by 2009, the fifth season of the popular show was broadcast on TV4. The fifth season of Mimmi & Mojje was taped on Mallorca. Mimmi came in third place at the talent-show Stjärnskott 2008 where she performed the song Enough is enough along with Ellen Jonsson, she also came second in Idrestjärnan 2008. During the summer of 2008, Sandén had a role in the musical Hujeda mej vá många sånger along with notable singers like Linus Wahlgren, Hanna Hedlund, Ola Forssmed, Bianca Wahlgren-Ingrosso, Benjamin Wahlgren, Frida Sandén, Vendela Palmgren, and Josefine Götestam. In early 2009, it was revealed that due to the success of the musical another summer of the musical would be done during the summer of 2009.

Mimmi is the younger sister of singer Molly Sandén who represented Sweden in the Junior Eurovision Song Contest 2006 and Frida Sandén who represented Sweden in the Junior Eurovision Song Contest 2007. Mimmi become the third Sandén sister to represent Sweden in the contest, where she performed the song "Du" in the Junior Eurovision Song Contest 2009 in Kyiv. This was not be the first time Mimmi stood on stage in the Junior Eurovision Song Contest as she was in the choir behind her sister Molly along with other sister Frida Sandén during her performance in the Junior Eurovision Song Contest 2006. Molly then as a favour was in the choir during the Talang 2007 final when Mimmi performed.

She also is featured on Neiked's 2017 song Call Me.

TV appearances
2007 - Talang 2007
2007 - Mimmi och Mojje
2007 - Mimmi och Mojje på Turne
2008 - Mimmi och Mojje i Karibien
2008 - Mimmi och Mojje i fjällen
2009 - Mimmi och Mojje - Den Mystiska Mallorcapärlan
2009 - Junior Eurovision Song Contest 2009
2011 - Mimmi & Mojje - Vampyrernas Återkomst

References

External links
Official website

1995 births
Talang (Swedish TV series) contestants
Junior Eurovision Song Contest entrants
Living people
Swedish pop singers
Swedish television actresses
Swedish voice actresses
Actresses from Stockholm
21st-century Swedish singers
21st-century Swedish women singers